The Wooden Mosque is a unique mosque situated south-east of the city of Nishapur, Iran. This mosque, built completely of wood, is one of the tourist attractions of the county of Nishapur and is situated inside a garden. There are also some handicraft shops, a restaurant, and other wooden buildings inside the garden of the Wooden Mosque.

Pictures

References 
Official website
Panoramic Images of Wooden Mosque، Neyshabur Day

Mosques in Iran
Buildings and structures in Nishapur
Buildings and structures in Razavi Khorasan Province